Sky Cabs (Pvt.) Ltd. was a cargo airline from Sri Lanka, which was headquartered at Bandaranaike International Airport, Colombo and had approximately 50 employees.

History
The company was registered on 1 November 1991 and was issued an operating licence in 1993. Sky Cabs offered scheduled and chartered international freight transport using a fleet of Antonov An-8 and An-12 aircraft. The following destinations were served on a regular, scheduled basis:

Terminated destinations

Formerly operated

Subsequent closure

Investigation into the accident revealed a number of procedural failures, including the fact that the aircraft had been operated without a valid licence.

As a consequence, all international cargo airlines of Sri Lanka were grounded and had to be reassessed. Sky Cabs failed this procedure, and was subsequently shut down.

Accidents and incidents
On March 24, 2000, Sky Cabs Flight 702 from Bangkok crashed into a housing area near Bandaranaike International Airport due to fuel starvation. Three people on the ground were killed, as well as six of the eight occupants on board the Antonov An-12 (registered RA-11302).

References

External links 

Defunct airlines of Sri Lanka
Defunct cargo airlines
Airlines established in 1991
Airlines disestablished in 2000
2000 disestablishments in Sri Lanka
Sri Lankan companies established in 1991